The Henri Peyre French Institute was founded by distinguished Professor Mary Ann Caws and Professor Emeritus John W. Kneller in 1980 to honor the internationally acclaimed scholar Henri Peyre, critic and author of over 44 books, who is particularly notable for his significant work in introducing French modern literature to an American audience. The Institute recognizes this work and his service as a Distinguished Professor and Executive Officer of the Ph.D Program in French at the Graduate Center, City University of New York.

The Henri Peyre French Institute, which is maintained within the Graduate Center at CUNY, presents many varied cultural events at no cost to the public as it continues the tradition established by Peyre to extend access and develop interest in French and Francophone Literature. Additionally it supports the work of the Ph.D program in French at CUNY in the form of funding to students for French doctoral student conferences and scholarships for study. It also supports the publication of relevant scholarly works.

Notable Guests who have appeared at events funded fully or significantly by the Henri Peyre French Institute include: Venus Khoury- Ghata, Jean-Claude Schmitt, Julia Kristeva, Emmanuel Moses, Marie-Celie Agnant, David Lepoutre, Édouard Glissant, Dympna Callaghan, Honey Meconi, Antonia Feros, Malcolm Smuts, Sara Melzter, Jean Michel Frodon, Lynn Higgins Parents, Domna Stanton, Sylvie Weil, Marjorie Perloff.

Advisory board
Dr. Jane Vasiliou
(Ph.D. Program in French, The Graduate Center), Chair
Professor (emerita)Jeanine Parisier Plottel
(Ph.D. Program in French, The Graduate Center)
Professor Julia Przybos, Ph.D. Program in French Executive Officer, ex-officio.

Director
Professor Francesca Canadé Sautman,
(Ph.D. Program in French, The Graduate Center)

References

External links
Henri Peyre French Institute

City University of New York
1980 establishments in New York City
Graduate Center, CUNY